Ba Chúc is a town (thị trấn) of the Tri Tôn District of An Giang Province, Vietnam.  

During the Vietnam War, the village came to the attention of Americans when it was revealed in The New York Times that civilians there had been forced by ARVN officers and their American advisers to remove landmines planted by Viet Cong and NVA units.

In 1978 the village was the scene of the killing of an estimated 3,157 civilians by Khmer Rouge forces from neighbouring Cambodia in what became known as the Ba Chúc Massacre.

Notes and references

Communes of An Giang province
Populated places in An Giang province
Townships in Vietnam